Grenada first competed at the Olympic Games in 1984, and has participated in each Summer Olympic Games since then.  Grenada won its first medal in 2012, a gold in athletics.
The Grenada Olympic Committee was formed in 1984 and recognized in the same year.

Grenada has not competed in any Winter Olympic Games. After 28 years of competing in the Summer Olympic Games, Grenada won its first medal at the London 2012 Olympics, when Kirani James clocked a new national record of 43.94 seconds on 6 August 2012 to win gold in the Men's 400 meters. It was the smallest country in the history to win a Summer Olympic gold medal until Bermuda won one in 2021, and it is still the smallest sovereign state to win one.

At the Rio 2016 Olympics James again won another medal in the Men's 400 meters, this time a silver, with a time of 43.76s.  At the Tokyo 2020 Olympics James won a bronze in the same event.

Medal tables

Medals by Summer Games

Medals by sport

List of medalists

See also
 List of flag bearers for Grenada at the Olympics
 Grenada at the Commonwealth Games

External links